Cirque Calder is an artistic rendering of a circus created by the American  artist Alexander Calder. It involves wire models rigged to perform the various functions of the circus performers they represent, from contortionists to sword eaters to lion tamers. The models are made of various items, generally wire and wood. Calder began improvising performances of this circus during his time in Paris. He would comment in French during the performance.

The Cirque Calder is part of the permanent collection of the Whitney Museum in New York.

Bibliography
Calder, Alexander. An Autobiography With Pictures. HarperCollins, .

References

External links
 

1926 sculptures
Sculptures by Alexander Calder
Sculptures in New York City
Kinetic sculptors
Lions in art